Mohammed Nasser Ali Mohammed Al Mesmari (born March 18, 1988) is an Emirati footballer who plays as a striker .

References

Al Ain FC players
Baniyas Club players
Al-Wasl F.C. players
Fujairah FC players
Al Shabab Al Arabi Club Dubai players
Ajman Club players
Al Hamriyah Club players
Emirati footballers
Living people
UAE First Division League players
UAE Pro League players
1988 births
Association football forwards